The Hundred of Parilla is a hundred within the County of Chandos, South Australia.
It was established in 1894.

History
The traditional owners of the lands are the Ngargad Australian Aboriginal tribes.

See also
 Lands administrative divisions of South Australia

References

Parilla